Signal theft is a term used by pay television vendors to denounce various schemes used to obtain a signal for free, usually in connection with satellite or cable TV service. See:

 Card sharing
 Pirate decryption
 Cable television piracy